Edwin Taylor, JP (13 February 1905 – 25 September 1973) was a British master baker and politician from Bolton.

Bakery and Career
Taylor was educated at St John's School, Wingates, and Bolton Technical College. He left school when he was 13 and later on (30), he went into the bakery business and eventually opened his own bakery and confectioners' shop in his home town; keen to promote the business, he founded the Bolton and District Master Bakers' Association of which he became Chairman and eventually President. He was known locally as "the pie-man", or sometimes "The Dancing Pieman" because of his proficiency as a ballroom dancing champion. During the Second World War, Taylor served in the Auxiliary Fire Service.

Municipal service
In 1940 Taylor was co-opted onto Bolton Town Council as a Conservative for Tonge Ward (elections having been suspended due to the outbreak of war). He lost his seat in 1945 but regained it in 1947. In 1952 he was made a Justice of the Peace, and in 1955 he was elected as an Alderman of Bolton. He was chosen as Mayor of Bolton in 1959-60 and served as Deputy Mayor the following year.

Byelection campaign
Philip Bell QC, the Conservative Member of Parliament for Bolton East, was appointed as a County Court Judge in the summer of 1960, which required a byelection to replace him. Taylor was chosen as the new candidate. The byelection saw the decision of the Liberal Party to field a candidate, which broke a local pact which had held for 10 years whereby the Liberals left the Bolton East seat alone, and in return the Conservatives did not stand in Bolton West; the pact had achieved its objective of preventing the Labour Party from winning either.

Parliament
Taylor was elected by a margin of 641 votes over Labour candidate Robert Howarth, with the Liberal candidate Frank Byers securing a quarter of the vote. Dissension within the Labour Party over nuclear disarmament was thought to have helped Taylor win. On taking his seat, one Labour MP immediately recommended that Taylor should be put on the Kitchen Committee of the House of Commons.

In his first year in Parliament, Taylor was much concentrated on fire safety after a fire  in a club in Bolton killed 19 people. In 1962 he tabled an amendment calling on limits on the importation of cloth and yarn to prevent dumping by foreign competitors. He also joined the 1964 rebellion against the abolition of resale price maintenance. At the 1964 general election, a more organised Labour campaign in Bolton East saw Taylor voted out by a margin of more than 3,000 votes (with the Liberals simultaneously losing Bolton West by roughly the same margin).

Subsequent career
Taylor subsequently fought the 1966 general election attempting to regain his seat. In May 1973 he was elected to Greater Manchester County Council, but died four months later.

References
M. Stenton and S. Lees, "Who's Who of British MPs" Vol. IV (Harvester Press, 1981)
The Times

External links
Famous Boltonians

1905 births
1973 deaths
People from Bolton
Mayors of Bolton
Conservative Party (UK) MPs for English constituencies
UK MPs 1959–1964
British bakers
Conservative Party (UK) mayors